Eastfields is an area of South London situated between Mitcham and Streatham. The area is home to St Mark's Academy (formerly known as Eastfields and then Mitcham Vale) secondary school and to Mitcham Eastfields railway station, which opened on 2 June 2008. The area has two council estates, Laburnum and Eastfields Estate, 5 minutes away from each other. The area is covered by the postcodes CR4 and SW16.

Transport and locale

Nearest places
 Mitcham
 Norbury
 Streatham
 Tooting
 Croydon
 Thornton Heath
 Pollards Hill

Nearest stations
Mitcham Eastfields railway station
Mitcham Junction railway station
Mitcham tram stop
Tooting railway station
Norbury railway station
Streatham Common railway station

Areas of London
Districts of the London Borough of Merton